The Bankruptcy Act 1861 (24 & 25 Vict c 134) was an Act of the Parliament of the United Kingdom.

Section 69 abolished the distinction between traders and non traders, so both could apply for bankruptcy.

Section 199 provided that any petition presented after another deed (for example a deed of arrangement with creditors) could be stayed.

Bankruptcy Amendment Act 1862

The Act 25 & 26 Vict c 99, sometimes called the Bankruptcy Amendment Act 1862, the Bankruptcy Act (1861) Amendment Act or the Bankruptcy Act 1862, was an Act of the Parliament of the United Kingdom. The Bill for this Act was called the Bankruptcy Act (1861) Amendment Bill. Section 4 of this Act is said to have been one of the County Courts Acts 1846 to 1887.
This Act, except section 4, was repealed by section 20 of, and the Schedule to, the Bankruptcy Repeal and Insolvent Court Act 1869 (32 & 33 Vict c 83) with savings in section 20. Section 4 was repealed by section 188 of, and the Schedule to, the County Courts Act 1888 (51 & 52 Vict c 43), subject to a proviso in section 188.

See also
UK insolvency law
UK bankruptcy law
History of bankruptcy law

Notes and references
William Hazlit and Henry Philip Roche. The Bankruptcy Act, 1861, Incorporating So Much as Remains in Force of the Bankrupt Law Consolidation Act, 1849, and of the Bankruptcy Act, 1854. V and R Stevens and Sons. H Sweet and W Maxwell. London. 1861. Google Books.
Griffith, William Downes (ed). The Bankruptcy Act, 1861, and General Orders in Bankruptcy. H Sweet. London. 1862. Google Books.
Thomas Edlyne Tomlins. The New Bankruptcy Act (23 & 24 Vic. Cap. 134) Complete; with an Analysis of Its Enactments; the Unrepealed Clauses of the Act of 1849, Shewing Their Application to the New Act, 1861; and an Index. Hodson and Son. London. 1861. Google Books.
Nicol, Henry. The Bankruptcy Acts, 1849, 1854 and 1861. H Sweet. London. 1861. Google Books.
Guest, John. The Bankruptcy Act, 1861: (County Courts): A Summary of the New Practice of the County Courts in Bankruptcy. Simpkin and Marshall. Stevens, Sons and Haynes. London. S B Howell. Birmingham. 1862. Google Books.
John Peter de Gex and Richard Horton Smith. Second Supplement to Arrangements Between Debtors and Creditors Under the Bankruptcy Act, 1861. Stevens and Sons. London. 1869. Google Books.
Shelford, Leonard. The Law of Bankruptcy and Insolvency, Comprising the Statutes Now in Force on Those Subjects, Methodically Arranged, and the Reported Cases Thereon to the Present Time. Third Edition. William Maxwell. London. Hodges, Smith & Co. Dublin. 1862. 
Griffiths, William Downes. The Law and Practice in Bankruptcy. 1867. Volume 1. 1869. Volume 2.
The Law Reports. Digest of Cases. 1892. Volume 2. Cols 266, 267 271 et seq (allowance and annulment), 281 et seq (appeal), 323, 324, 354 et seq (discharge), 415 et seq (juridiction), 591, 592, 1705 et seq (creditor's deed).
 "New Bankruptcy Act" (1861) 1 Law Students' Examination Chronicle 208; (1862) 2 Law Students' Examination Chronicle 49

Insolvency law of the United Kingdom
United Kingdom Acts of Parliament 1861